King Creek is a stream in Meeker County, in the U.S. state of Minnesota. It is a tributary of the Crow River.

King Creek was named for William S. King, a cattleman.

See also
List of rivers of Minnesota

References

Rivers of Meeker County, Minnesota
Rivers of Minnesota